Ian Curtis Young (born September 27, 1981) is an American-Trinidadian professional basketball player. Standing at 6 ft 3 in (1.91 m), Young primarily plays as point guard. Young played 13 professional years overseas in various countries. Before turning professional, Ian was an All-SEC point guard at Auburn University and a 2-Time Junior College All-American at Des Moines Area CC (DMACC).

International career
He represented Trinidad and Tobago's national basketball team at the 2010 Centrobasket in Santo Domingo, Dominican Republic, where he recorded most points and assists for his team.
In the 2009 CBC Trinidad finished in fourth place with a 3–1 record led by Ian Young who averaged 18.6 PPG and 8.0 APG.

He signed with the Brujos de Guayama of the Baloncesto Superior Nacional appearing in two games.

References

External links
 ESPN profile
 NBA D-League profile

1981 births
Living people
Auburn Tigers men's basketball players
HKK Široki players
Junior college men's basketball players in the United States
KTP-Basket players
Associação Macaé de Basquete players
Point guards
Ratiopharm Ulm players
Trinidad and Tobago men's basketball players
Gaiteros del Zulia players